Monica Moreno may refer to:

 Mónica Moreno, Mexican volleyball player
 Recurring actor of Pretty Little Liars, see: List of Pretty Little Liars characters#Recurring